Nikos Krotsidhas (born 24 March 1986) is a Greek football player who plays for Aiolikos.

He previously played for Aiolikos in the Gamma Ethniki.

References

1986 births
Living people
Greek footballers
Association football midfielders
Aiolikos F.C. players
People from Mytilene
Sportspeople from the North Aegean